Pasheh Dan may refer to:
 Pasheh Dan, Rostam